The following is a list of the MTV Europe Music Award winners and nominees for Best Arabian Act. In 2012 award was given as Best Middle East Act.

2000s

2010s

award given as Best Middle East Act

Arabia Act
Saudi Arabian music
Egyptian music
Lebanese music
Jordanian music
Emirati music
Tunisian music
Moroccan music
Arab culture
Awards established in 2007